N. exigua may refer to:

 Nassula exigua, a ciliate protist
 Nectriella exigua, a sac fungus
 Neopetrosia exigua, a marine sponge
 Nicotiana exigua, a tobacco plant
 Nucula exigua, a nut clam
 Nymphoides exigua, an aquatic plant